Abner of Burgos (c. 1270 – c. 1347, or a little later) was a Jewish philosopher, a convert to Christianity and a polemical writer against his former religion. Known after his conversion as Alfonso of Valladolid.

Life
As a student he acquired a certain mastery in Biblical and Talmudical studies, to which he added an intimate acquaintance with Peripatetic philosophy and astrology. He graduated as a physician at 25, but throughout a long life he seems to have found the struggle for existence a hard one. He stated that his religious doubts arose in 1295 when he treated a number of Jews for distress following their involvement in the failed messianic movement in Avila. As Abner reported in his Moreh Zedek/Mostrador de justicia, he "had a dream" in which a similar experience of crosses mysteriously appearing on his garments drove him to question his ancestral faith.

Not being of those contented ones who, as Moses Narboni observes in his Maamar ha-Beḥirah (Essay on the Freedom of the Will; quoted by Grätz, p. 488), are satisfied with a peck of locust beans from one Friday to another, he resolved to embrace Christianity. The timing of his conversation is uncertain with Pablo de Santa María (Scrutinium Scripturarum) suggesting the event occurred when Abner was of the advanced age of sixty, However, according to other writers, Abner took this step soon after he graduated in medicine. According to the statements of his contemporaries such as Narboni, he converted, not from spiritual conviction, but for the sake of temporal advantage. Something of the apostate's pricking conscience seemed to have remained with him, despite his being immediately rewarded with a sacristan's post in the prominent Metropolitan Church in Valladolid (from where he took the name of Alfonso of Valladolid). The argument that Abner converted for material gain is put into question by the fact that his post as a sacristan was extremely modest and he never, throughout his long and public polemical career after conversion (c. 1320–1347), advanced in his post to something more lucrative.

Polemics
Abner's most distinguishing characteristic was his use of post-biblical literature, including hundreds of Talmudic and Midrashic sources as well as much medieval Jewish and Arabic (in translation) literature, all in an effort to prove the truth of Christianity. Equally striking was that he wrote his anti-Judaism polemics in Hebrew, unlike virtually every polemicist in the history of Christianity. His most important work, the Moreh Zedek (Teacher of Righteousness), which now survives only in a 14th-century Castilian translation as Mostrador de Justicia, is one of the longest and most elaborate polemics against Judaism ever written and is considered one of the key sources for the history of anti-Jewish thought in fourteenth century Western Europe. Abner's text rivals (and in many ways surpasses) the Raymond Martini's Pugio Fidei in length, complexity, variety of sources and psychological impact, although there is no evidence that Abner actually knew of the polemical Dominican's work.

In an essay entitled Minhat Qenaot (A Jealousy Offering), he argued that man's actions are determined by planetary influence, and he reinterpreted the notion of choice and free will in light of that determinism. Both his conversion and this defence of determinism aroused protests from his Jewish former study-partner, Isaac Pulgar, marked by great bitterness.  Abner also exchanged a number of polemical letters with local Jews, which have survived along with each of their responses and the final riposte to all the letters by Abner, a short work known as the Teshuvot ha-Meshubot.

Abner presented charges before Alfonso XI of Castile, accusing his former brethren of using the Birkat haMinim, a prayer-formula in their ritual, which blasphemed the Christian God and cursed all Christians.  The king ordered a public investigation at Valladolid, in which the representatives of the Jewish community were confronted by Abner. The conclusion was announced in the form of a royal edict forbidding the use of the formula in question (February 1336). Abner further accused the Jews of constantly warring among themselves and splitting into hostile religious schisms. In support of this statement he came up with an alleged list of the "sects" prevailing among them: Sadducees, Samaritans, and other divisions. He makes two "sects" of Pharisees and Rabbinites, stated that cabalists believed in a tenfold God, and spoke of a brand-new "sect" believing in a dual Deity, God and Metatron.

Works
The following is a list of Abner's writings:
The Moreh Zedek (Teacher of Righteousness), surviving only as the Mostrador de justicia (Paris BN MS Esp. 43, consisting of a dialogue containing ten chapters of discussions between a religious teacher (Abner?) and a Jewish controversialist.
Teshuvot la-Meharef (Response to the Blasphemer), also in Castilian translation, Respuestas al blasfemo (Rome. Biblioteca Apostolica Vaticana MS 6423)
Polemical letters and the Teshuvot ha-Meshubot.
The Libro de la ley
The determinist philosophical work Minhat Qenaot (Offering of Zeal), surviving only in Castilian translation as Ofrenda de Zelos or Libro del Zelo de Dios (Rome. Biblioteca Apostolica Vaticana MS 6423)
A Mathematical treatise Meyyasher Aqob (Straightening the Curve)

Some of his lost works may include:
 A commentary on Ibn Ezra's commentary on the Decalogue, written before his apostasy.
 '[[Milhamoth ha-Shem|'Sefer Milhamot Adonai]] ("Wars of the Lord"). This was translated into Spanish, at the request of the Infanta Doña Blanca, prioress of a convent in Burgos, under the title "Las Batallas de Dios."
 La Concordia de las Leyes, an attempt to provide Old Testament foundations for Christian dogmas. According to Reinhardt and Santiago (p. 86, n. 10.4) this text is found in Paris BN MS Esp. 43.
 Iggeret ha-Gezerah (Epistle on Fate).

Some of the works falsely attributed to him include:
 Libro de las tres gracias, Madrid Biblioteca Nacional MS 9302 (Kayserling). The title is a misreading of Libro de las tres creencias. According to Reinhardt and Santiago (pp. 86–88, n. 10.5) the text is also found in Escorial MSS h.III.3 and P.III.21, where it is called the Libro declarante.Libro de las hadas (also attributed to the Pseudo-San Pedro Pascual). According to Reinhardt and Santiago (p. 88, n. 10.6) this text is also found in Escorial MSS h.III.3 and P.III.21Sermones a los moros y judios. Found as anonymous in Soria: Casa de la Cultura, MS 25-H (Reinhardt and Santiago, p. 314, n. 143.6)
The Epistola Rabbi Samualis and Disputatio Abutalib of Alfonsus Bonihiminis.

See also
Criticism of Judaism
Petrus Alfonsi

Notes

References
Abner of Burgos/Alfonso of Valladolid. Meyyasher Aqob. Ed. G. M. Gluskina. Moscow, 1983.
---. Mostrador de Justicia. Ed. Walter Mettmann. 2 vols. Abhandlungen der Nordrhein-Westfälischen Akademie der Wissenschaften, vol 92/1-2. Opladen: Westdeutscher Verlag, 1994; 1996.
---. Teshuvot la-Meharef. In "The Polemical Exchange between Isaac Pollegar and Abner of Burgos/Alfonso of Valladolid according to Parma MS 2440 'Iggeret Teshuvat Apikoros' and 'Teshuvot la-Meharef'.” Ed. and Trans. Jonathan Hecht. Diss. New York University, 1993.
---. Těshuvot la-Měharef. Spanische Fassung. Ed. Walter Mettmann. Abhandlungen der Nordrhein-Westfälischen Akademie der Wissenschaften, vol 101. Opladen: Westdeutscher Verlag, 1998.
 Gershenzon, Shoshanna. "A Study of Teshuvot la-meharef by Abner of Burgos." Diss. Jewish Theological Seminary of New York, 1984.
Heinrich Grätz, Gesch. d. Juden, 3rd ed., vii.289-293.
Meyer Kayserling, Biblioteca Esp.-Port. Judaica, p. 114.
Loeb, "La Controverse Religieuse," in Rev. de l'Histoire des Religions, xviii.142, and in "Polémistes Chrétiens et Juifs," in Rev. Ét. Juives, xviii.52.
Reinhardt, Klaus, and Horacio Santiago-Otero. Biblioteca bíblica ibérica medieval. Madrid: Consejo Superior de Investigaciones Científicas, 1986.
Sainz de la Maza Vicioso, Carlos. "Alfonso de Valladolid: Edición y estudio del manuscrito lat. 6423 de la Biblioteca Apostólica Vaticana." Diss. U. Complutense, 1990. Madrid: Editorial de la Universidad Complutense de Madrid, Servicio de Reprografía, 1990.
Szpiech, Ryan.  Conversion and Narrative: Reading and Religious Authority in Medieval Polemic. Philadelphia: University of Pennsylvania Press, 2013.
---. "From Testimonia to Testimony: Thirteenth-Century Anti-Jewish Polemic and the Moreh Zedek/Mostrador de justicia'' of Abner of Burgos/ Alfonso of Valladolid." Diss. Yale University, 2006.

External links
Ryan Szpiech, "From Testimonia to Testimony: Thirteenth-Century Anti-Jewish Polemic and the Mostrador de justicia of Abner of Burgos/Alfonso of Valladolid."
Ryan Szpiech, Conversion and Narrative: Reading and Religious Authority in Medieval Polemic.

1270 births
1348 deaths
People from Burgos
Medieval Jewish philosophers
Spanish philosophers
14th-century philosophers
13th-century Castilian Jews
14th-century Castilian Jews
Conversos
Spanish Roman Catholics
Critics of Judaism
14th-century Roman Catholics